Aida or Aïda is a female given name. Variants include: Aidda, Ada, Aeeda, Aída, Aide, Aidee, Ade, Ajda, Ayeda, Ayeeda, Ayida, Ida, Ieeda, Ieda, Ieta and Iyeeda. The name is derived from the Arabic name "" "", or "" "" in Classical Arabic.

Variants
The name was used by Auguste Mariette for his sketch of the plot which Giuseppe Verdi later used for his opera of the same title, Aida. In the Italian opera, Aida is an Ethiopian princess. Mariette claimed that the name was authentically Egyptian, writing in a letter "Don't be alarmed by the title. Aida is an Egyptian name. Normally it would be Aita. But that name would be too harsh, and the singers would irresistibly soften it to Aida." It may be derived from a name recorded on the Rosetta Stone.

Unrelated to this origin, the Italian meaning for Aida is "Happy". "Aida" is also sometimes traced to other African languages. Aida (相田) is also a Japanese surname.

Notable people named Aida
 Aída Álvarez (born 1950), Puerto Rican politician and journalist
 Aida el Ayoubi (born 1961), Egyptian singer
 Aida Badić (born 1986), Croatian artistic gymnast
 Aida Bamia, professor emeritus of Arabic language and literature at the University of Florida in Gainesville
 Aida Baraku (born 1971), Albanian Kosovar singer, composer, journalist and television producer
 Aida Begić (born 1976), Bosnian film director and screenwriter
 Aida Chalhoub (born 1951), Lebanese singer
 Aida Čorbadžić (born 1976), Bosnian opera singer
 Aida Cuevas (born 1963), Mexican ranchera music singer and actress
 Aida Delgado-Colon (born 1955), chief United States District Judge for the District of Puerto Rico
 Aida Desta (1927–2013), eldest granddaughter of Emperor Haile Selassie of Ethiopia
 Aïda Mady Diallo, French-born Malian novelist and director
 Aida Diestro (1924–1973), Cuban pianist and director of the vocal group Cuarteto d'Aida
 Aida Edemariam, Ethiopian-Canadian journalist based in the UK
 Aida Karina Estrada (born 1987), Guatemalan beauty pageant winner
 Aida Fariscal (born 1940), Filipino police officer
 Aida Folch (born 1986), Catalan Spanish actress
 Aida Fustuq, Lebanese former wife of Saudi ruler King Abdullah
 Aída García Naranjo (born 1951), Peruvian educator, singer, and politician
 Aida Garifullina (born 1987), Russian opera singer
 Aida González (born 1962), Panamanian writer and doctor
 Aida Hadzialic (born 1987), Swedish politician
 Aida Imanguliyeva (1939–1992), Azerbaijani academic
 Aida Jordão, Portuguese-Canadian playwright
 Aida El-Khadra, American particle physicist
 Aida El-Kashef (born 1988), feminist Egyptian film-maker, actress and director
 Aída Kemelmajer (born 1945), Argentine jurist
 Aida Mahmudova (born 1982), Azerbaijan artist
 Aida Mbodj (born 1955), Senegalese politician, Vice-President of the National Assembly of Senegal
 Aida Mohamed (born 1976), Hungarian foil fencer
 Aida Mohammadkhani (born 1987), Iranian actress 
 Aida Mollenkamp (born 1980), American chef and TV personality
 Aida Muluneh (born 1974), photographer
 Aida Najjar (1938–2020), Palestinian-Jordanian writer 
 Aida Navarro (born 1937), Venezuelan mezzo-soprano
 Aida Nikolaychuk (born 1982), Ukrainian pop singer and model
 Aida Nuño Palacio (born 1983), Spanish female cyclo-cross cyclist
 Aida Reyna (born 1950), Peruvian volleyball player
 Aida Rodriguez (born 1977), American comedian, actress, producer and writer
 Aïda Ruilova (born 1974), American contemporary artist
 Aida Shanayeva (born 1986), Russian foil fencer
 Aida Steshenko (born 1968), Turkmen table tennis player
 Aida Toledo (born 1952), Guatemalan poet, short story writer, non-fiction writer and educator
 Aida Tomescu (born 1955), Australian painter
 Aida Touma-Suleiman (born 1964), Israeli Arab journalist and politician
 Aida Turturro (born 1962), American actress
 Aida Vedishcheva (born 1941), Soviet and Russian singer of Jewish descent
 Aida Overton Walker (1880–1914), American vaudeville performer, actress, singer, dancer and choreographer
 Aida Ward (1900–1984), American jazz singer
 Aida Woolf (1886-1967), British dress designer 
 Aída Yéspica (born 1982), Venezuelan beauty pageant

References

Spanish feminine given names